Apaaratha is a 1992 Indian Malayalam-language film produced and directed by I. V. Sasi, starring Rahman, Sukanya (in her Malayalam debut), Urvashi, Siddique and M. G. Soman.

Plot

Apaaratha is an emotional family film.

Cast

Rahman as Prathapan
Sukanya as Surya
Urvasi as Prabha
Siddique  as Suresh
Jagathy Sreekumar as Minnal Chacko
Nedumudi Venu as K.P Menon
M. G. Soman as Singapore Pillai
Rajan P. Dev as Theeppori Madhavan
Mamukkoya as Jamal
Innocent as SI Lonappan
K. P. A. C. Lalitha as Arival Kochammini
Shanthi Krishna as Soumini
Janardhanan as Phalgunan
Sreenath as Sudhakaran
Unni Mary as Nalini
Roshni as Renuka
Geetha Vijayan
Kalpana as Mary
Raghu as Hari
Ramu as Jayapalan Panicker
Kunchan as Abdullah
Lalu Alex

Soundtrack
Songs were composed by Ilaiyaraaja and lyrics by Sreekumaran Thampi.

"Karthaavuyarthezhunnetta" - P Jayachandran
"Melle Melle Vannu (male)" - KJ Yesudas
"Melle Melle Vannu (duet)" - KJ Yesudas, KS Chithra
"Pullankuzhal Nadham - KS Chithra
"Melle Melle (female)" - KS Chithra

References

External links
 

1990 films
1990s Malayalam-language films
Indian family films
Films scored by Ilaiyaraaja
Films directed by I. V. Sasi